Sibbald may refer to:

Places
Sibbald is a hamlet in Alberta, Canada
Cape Sibbald, a cliffed cape by Lady Newnes Bay in Antarctica

People
Sibbald (surname)